Belgrade Oblast was one of the oblasts of the Kingdom of Serbs, Croats and Slovenes from 1922 to 1929. Its administrative center was Belgrade.

History

The Kingdom of Serbs, Croats and Slovenes was formed in 1918 and was initially divided into counties and districts (this division was inherited from previous state administrations). In 1922, new administrative units known as oblasts (Serbo-Croatian: oblasti / области) were introduced and the whole country was divided into 33 oblasts. Before 1922, territory of Belgrade Oblast was part of the Belgrade, Novi Sad, and Veliki Bečkerek districts.

In 1924, as the result of an adjustment of the border between the Kingdom of Serbs, Croats and Slovenes and Romania, the town of Žombolj (Jimbolia) was transferred to Romania.

In 1929, 33 oblasts were administratively replaced with 9 banovinas and one district, and territory of Belgrade Oblast was administratively divided between the Belgrade City Administration and the Danube Banovina.

Geography

The Belgrade Oblast included small northern part of Šumadija near Belgrade, western parts of Banat and eastern parts of Bačka. It shared borders with the Bačka Oblast and Syrmia Oblast in the west, the Valjevo Oblast in the south-west, the Podunavlje Oblast in the south-east, Romania in the north-east and Hungary in the north.

Demographics

According to 1921 census, oblast had linguistically heterogeneous population: speakers of Serbo-Croatian were dominant in the cities of Belgrade, Pančevo, Veliki Bečkerek and Velika Kikinda, as well as in the districts of Belgrade, Umka, Kovačica, Veliki Bečkerek, Turski Bečej, Velika Kikinda, Titel and Žabalj; speakers of German were dominant in the district of Pančevo; speakers of Romanian were dominant in the district of Žombolj; while speakers of Hungarian were dominant in the city of Senta and in the districts of Senta, Stari Bečej and Turska Kanjiža.

Administrative units

Oblast included following districts:
Belgrade
Kovačica
Pančevo
Senta
Stari Bečej
Titel
Turska Kanjiža
Turski Bečej
Umka
Velika Kikinda
Veliki Bečkerek
Žabalj
Žombolj

Besides these districts, several cities in the oblast had a separate status:
Belgrade
Pančevo
Senta
Velika Kikinda
Veliki Bečkerek

Cities and towns

Main cities and towns in the district were:
Belgrade
Pančevo
Senta
Stari Bečej
Velika Kikinda
Veliki Bečkerek

All mentioned cities and towns are today in Serbia.

See also

Belgrade
Kingdom of Serbs, Croats and Slovenes

References

Further reading

Istorijski atlas, Geokarta, Beograd, 1999.
Istorijski atlas, Intersistem kartografija, Beograd, 2010.

External links

Map of the Oblast
Map of the Oblast
Map of the Oblast

 

1920s in Belgrade
Oblasts of the Kingdom of Serbs, Croats and Slovenes